Sir William Blackett, 2nd Baronet of Newcastle-upon-Tyne (11 February 1690 – 25 September 1728), of Pilgrim Street, Newcastle-upon-Tyne and Wallington Hall, Northumberland, was a British landowner and Tory politician who sat in the House of Commons from 1710 to 1728.

Blackett was the son of William Blackett and his wife Julia Conyers. He was educated at University College, Oxford. On the death of his father in 1705, he succeeded to the baronetcy and to Wallington Hall, Cambo.

Blackett was elected Member of Parliament for Newcastle-upon-Tyne in 1710, and retained the seat until 1728.
 He was elected Mayor of Newcastle for 1718–19.

Blackett was a Jacobite but toned down his support after a warrant was issued for his arrest.

He married Barbara Villiers, daughter of the Earl of Jersey, in 1725. They had no children, although he had previously had an illegitimate daughter, Elizabeth Orde; the baronetcy became extinct upon his death. He bequeathed his estates at Allendale, Northumberland and Wallington Hall, Cambo to his nephew Sir Walter Calverley, 2nd Baronet of Calverley, conditional upon the latter's marriage to Elizabeth Orde, Blackett's natural daughter and his change of name to Blackett.

References

Further reading

1690 births
1728 deaths
Alumni of University College, Oxford
Baronets in the Baronetage of England
Mayors of Newcastle upon Tyne
Members of the Parliament of Great Britain for English constituencies
British MPs 1710–1713
British MPs 1713–1715
British MPs 1715–1722
British MPs 1722–1727